La Clownesse fantôme, released in the United States as The Shadow-Girl and in the United Kingdom as Twentieth Century Conjuring, is a 1902 French short silent film directed by Georges Méliès.

Synopsis

Survival 
The film was presumed lost until the 1990s, when it was identified among a collection of early silent films rediscovered in Sulphur Springs, Texas, in 1993. This surviving fragment, about half the length of the complete film, premiered at the Pordenone Silent Film Festival in 1997.

References 

French silent short films
French black-and-white films
Films directed by Georges Méliès
1902 films
1902 short films
1900s rediscovered films
Rediscovered French films
1900s French films